Hell Hath Fury may refer to:

 "Hell Hath Fury", an episode of Garth Marenghi's Darkplace
 "Hell Hath Fury", a short story by Cleve Cartmill

See also
 Hell Hath No Fury (disambiguation)